Moira Smiley (Moira Gwendolyn Smiley, b. 21 May 1976) is an American singer, composer, lyricist and musician born in New Haven, Vermont. She has been described as being a multi-instrumentalist who excels on banjo, accordion and piano, in addition to using body percussion. Smiley's music has been influenced by folk styles, shape-note singing, classical song, and jazz. Smiley has performed and collaborated with various artists including Billy Childs, Solas, Jayme Stone's The Lomax Project, choral composer Eric Whitacre, Los Angeles Master Chorale, New World Symphony, and often tours with eclectic indie-pop group Tune-Yards.

Early life and education 
Smiley grew up in a farmhouse in rural New Haven, Vermont. As a teenager, she attended the Village Harmony Summer Camp and joined Village Harmony Vermont youth ensemble. Smiley was among the 9 composers from Village Harmony that were represented on the Endless Light recording in 1996. She entered Indiana University’s Jacobs School of Music in 1994 to study piano performance, but earned her degree in Early Music Vocal Performance. After college she traveled and studied the folk music and multi-part harmonies of Eastern Europe (Croatia, Bosnia, Serbia, Bulgaria) as well as the traditional Irish Sean Nós singing.

Career 
While at Indiana University she founded the vocal quartet VIDA, which won Bloomington Voice's Battle of the Bands contest. They went on to perform across the U.S. and Europe as part of the IMG Artists roster. She also began performing and recording with early music ensembles such as Paul Hillier’s Theater of Voices, Sinfonye, The Dufay Collective and Fretwork Consort of Viols as well as with American composer, Malcolm Dalglish.

In 2005 she released her first solo album Rua. The following year she released Blink, her first album with her vocal group VOCO. In 2013 Smiley and her group VOCO performed "Music for a Three-Layer Brain" for the TEDxCaltech "The Brain" event. In 2018 she began collaborating with the Seamus Egan Project, performing vocals and accordion. She sang "Days of War", her song written with Séamus Egan for a concert on Front Row Boston. In 2018 she released her second solo album, Unzip the Horizon, which The Bluegrass Situation called "the work of a significant talent finding new possibilities in her voice." In 2018 and 2019, Smiley led an immersive a cappella experience with the Los Angeles Master Chorale at the Walt Disney Concert Hall’s BIG SING California event.  In February, 2021 she released the vocal album, In Our Voices.

Awards 
In 2002, Smiley won the Barbara Thornton Memorial Scholarship for Medieval Music, given by the Sequentia Ensemble.

In 2007, Smiley (along with fellow composers Ron Bartlett, Charlie Campagna) won the annual Lester Horton Award for "Music for Dance" for a score commissioned by choreographers Regina Klenjoski and Monica Favand for Klenjoski’s The Black Drim, which was subsequently performed by Smiley & VOCO (along with the TRIP Music Ensemble) for the Synergy concert at the John Anson Ford Amphitheatre, in LA.

In 2007, her ensemble Moira Smiley & VOCO were named national champions of the 30+ year old Harmony Sweepstakes A Cappella Festival.

Discography

Solo albums 
 Unzip The Horizon (2018)
 Rua (2005)

With VOCO 
 In Our Voices (2021)
 Laughter Out of Tears (2014)
 Small Worlds (2009)
 Circle, Square, Diamond and Flag (2008)
 Blink (2006)

With VIDA 
 Blue Album (2000)
 In Bloom(1999)
 Vida (1997)

Soundtracks 
 Changing Woman (2002)
 Sacred Ground (2001)

References

External links 
 Official website

Year of birth missing (living people)
Living people
American women composers
Singers from Vermont
Songwriters from Vermont
People from New Haven, Vermont
21st-century American composers
21st-century American women singers
21st-century women composers
Jacobs School of Music alumni